Borba is a municipality in the District of Évora in Portugal. The population in 2011 was 7,333, in an area of 145.19 km2. It was elevated from town to city status on 12 June 2009.

The municipal holiday is Easter Monday.

Parishes
Administratively, the municipality is divided into 4 civil parishes (freguesias):
 Borba (Matriz)
 Borba (São Bartolomeu)
 Orada
 Rio de Moinhos

Notable people 
 Vítor Norte (born 1951) an actor and voice actor.
 Luís Bilro (born 1971) a Portuguese retired football with 411 club caps

See also
Borba DOC

References

External links
Town Hall official website

Municipalities of Évora District
Cities in Portugal